Cinnamic acid is an organic compound with the formula C6H5-CH=CH-COOH. It is a white crystalline compound that is slightly soluble in water, and freely soluble in many organic solvents.  Classified as an unsaturated carboxylic acid, it occurs naturally in a number of plants. It exists as both a cis and a trans isomer, although the latter is more common.

Occurrence and production

Biosynthesis
Cinnamic acid is a central intermediate in the biosynthesis of a myriad of natural products including lignols (precursors to lignin and lignocellulose), flavonoids, isoflavonoids, coumarins, aurones, stilbenes, catechin, and phenylpropanoids. Its biosynthesis involves the action of the enzyme phenylalanine ammonia-lyase (PAL) on phenylalanine.

Natural occurrence
It is obtained from oil of cinnamon, or from balsams such as storax. It is also found in shea butter. Cinnamic acid has a honey-like odor; it and its more volatile ethyl ester (ethyl cinnamate) are flavor components in the essential oil of cinnamon, in which related cinnamaldehyde is the major constituent.

Synthesis
Cinnamic acid was first synthesized by the base-catalysed condensation of acetyl chloride and benzaldehyde, followed by hydrolysis of the acid chloride product. In 1890, Rainer Ludwig Claisen described the synthesis of ethyl cinnamate via the reaction of ethyl acetate with benzaldehyde in the presence of sodium as base. Another way of preparing cinnamic acid is by the Knoevenagel condensation reaction. The reactants for this are benzaldehyde and malonic acid in the presence of a weak base, followed by acid-catalyzed decarboxylation.  It can also be prepared by oxidation of cinnamaldehyde, condensation of benzal chloride and sodium acetate (followed by acid hydrolysis), and the Perkin reaction. The oldest commercially used route to cinnamic acid involves the Perkin reaction, which is given in the following scheme

Metabolism
Cinnamic acid, obtained from autoxidation of cinnamaldehyde, is metabolized into sodium benzoate in the liver.

Uses
Cinnamic acid is used in flavorings, synthetic indigo, and certain pharmaceuticals. A major use is as a precursor to produce methyl cinnamate, ethyl cinnamate, and benzyl cinnamate for the perfume industry.  Cinnamic acid is a precursor to the sweetener aspartame via enzyme-catalysed amination to give phenylalanine. Cinnamic acid can dimerize in non-polar solvents resulting in different linear free energy relationships.

References

Flavors
Enoic acids